William Pat Jennings (August 20, 1919 – August 2, 1994) was a United States representative from Virginia.

Biography
Jennings was born on a farm in Camp, Virginia, in Smyth County, Virginia. He earned a B.S. degree from the Virginia Polytechnic Institute in Blacksburg, 1941. He entered the United States Army in July 1941 during World War II. He served in the United States Army for two years and in the European Theater of Operations for two and a half years with the Twenty-ninth Infantry as platoon leader, company commander, and operations officer. He was also an instructor in ROTC at the University of Illinois.  He was discharged as a major in May 1946.

Jennings owned an automobile and farm implement business in Marion, Virginia, from 1946 until his death. He also participated in politics and was a delegate to the Democratic National Convention in 1952, 1956, 1960, and 1968.  He was elected sheriff of Smyth County, Virginia in 1947, reelected in 1951, and served until 1954. He was elected as a Democrat to the Eighty-fourth Congress and to the five succeeding Congresses (January 3, 1955 – January 3, 1967), during which time he was a signatory to the 1956 Southern Manifesto that opposed the desegregation of public schools ordered by the Supreme Court in Brown v. Board of Education. Jennings voted against the Civil Rights Acts of 1957, 1960, and 1964, but voted in favor of the Voting Rights Act of 1965. He was an unsuccessful candidate for reelection in 1966 to the Ninetieth Congress. In 1966, journalist Drew Pearson reported that Jennings was one of a group of Congressman who had received the "Statesman of the Republic" award from Liberty Lobby for his "right-wing activities".  He was elected Clerk of the House of Representatives for the Ninetieth Congress, and reelected to the four succeeding Congresses, and served from January 10, 1967, until his resignation November 15, 1975. He died in Marion, Virginia in 1994, as the result of a tractor accident.

References

1919 births
1994 deaths
Accidental deaths in Virginia
United States Army officers
Military personnel from Virginia
Clerks of the United States House of Representatives
Virginia sheriffs
Democratic Party members of the United States House of Representatives from Virginia
People from Marion, Virginia
Virginia Tech alumni
Farming accident deaths
20th-century American politicians
United States Army personnel of World War II